The 3rd Army Corps (Russian: 3-й армейский корпус) was one of the main formations of the Armed Forces of South Russia (Russian: Вооружённых Сил Юга России, ВСЮР; VSUR) during the Russian Civil War.

This army unit was first known as the Crimean-Azov Army formed in VSYUR on January 10, 1919 on the basis of the Crimean-Azov Corps itself formed in December 1918. 
In May 1919 the Crimean-Azov Army was transformed into the 3rd Army Corps.

Composition
1st Brigade: Yakov Slashchov
2nd Brigade: AA Geiman
1st Division: Andrei Shkuro
Division: Sułtan Girej-Kłycz
4th Infantry Division: Yakov Slashchov (2nd formation)
13th Infantry Division (3rd formation)
34th Infantry Division (3rd formation)
6th Infantry Division (4th formation)
7th Infantry Division (4th formation)

Commanders
Vladimir Liakhov 1918–1919 (1st formation)
 Sergey Dobrorol'skij (28.05.1919 – 10 July 1919) (2nd formation)
 Nikolai Shilling (10.7.1919 – 26.08.1919)
 Yakov Slashchov (06.12.1919 – 04.09.1920)

Chiefs of Staff
E. V. Maslovskiy: 1918–1919 (1st formation)

References

External links
 Сайт историка Сергея Владимировича Волкова. Белое движение в России: организационная структура.
 Сайт историка Сергея Владимировича Волкова. Белое движение в России: организационная структура. 3-й армейский корпус.

Military units and formations of White Russia (Russian Civil War)